Levi Garrett is a brand of loose-leaf chewing tobacco produced by the American Snuff Company. Levi Garrett has a noticeably sweet flavour, with a larger cut than Red Man, Beech-Nut, and other brands of loose-leaf chewing tobacco.

History 

The brand Levi Garrett was introduced on the US market in 1974 by Conwood Corporation of Tennessee (later acquired by Dalfort). By 1981, it was already second in the US chewing tobacco market. Levi Garrett became known for their sponsorship of various teams in the NASCAR Cup Series. Most notably, the Hendrick Motorsports #5 driven by Geoff Bodine and Ricky Rudd.

Flavors and varieties
 Levi Garrett Original
 Levi Garrett Extra
 Levi Garrett Plug

References

Chewing tobacco brands
IARC Group 1 carcinogens